Emil Zimmermann is a retired East German slalom canoeist who competed from the mid-1950s to the early 1960s. He won two silver medals at the 1957 ICF Canoe Slalom World Championships in Augsburg, earning them in the C-1 event and the C-1 team event.

References

German male canoeists
Living people
Year of birth missing (living people)
Place of birth missing (living people)
Medalists at the ICF Canoe Slalom World Championships